Haile Tilahun Gebremariam (born 1954) is an Ethiopian military officer. On January 28, 2015 he was appointed the Head of Mission for United Nations Interim Security Force for Abyei (UNISFA) by United Nations Secretary-General Ban Ki-moon.

Biographical Information
As of 1989 Haile was a political commissar for the Ethiopian People's Revolutionary Democratic Front. He belonged to the Ethiopian People's Democratic Movement, which later became the Amhara National Democratic Movement.

1997-1998 Haile, then a Brigadier-General, served as Head of Education and Administration at the Ministry of Defence.

He served as Ethiopian Air Force Deputy Commander 1998-2001 and as State Minister of Defence 2003–2006., Following his career with the Ministry of Defence, Haile worked in the private sector as an adviser for an engineering company and an internal audit management company.

He studied at the Open University in the United Kingdom and holds a master's degree.

References

Living people
1954 births
Ethiopian generals
United Nations military personnel
Ethiopian officials of the United Nations